In bifurcation theory, a field within mathematics, a transcritical bifurcation is a particular kind of local bifurcation, meaning that it is characterized by an equilibrium having an eigenvalue whose real part passes through zero.

A transcritical bifurcation is one in which a fixed point exists for all values of a parameter and is never destroyed.  However, such a fixed point interchanges its stability with another fixed point as the parameter is varied.  In other words, both before and after the bifurcation, there is one unstable and one stable fixed point. However, their stability is exchanged when they collide. So the unstable fixed point becomes stable and vice versa.

The normal form of a transcritical bifurcation is

A typical example (in real life) could be the consumer-producer problem where the consumption is proportional to the (quantity of) resource.

For example:
 

where
  is the logistic equation of resource growth; and
  is the consumption, proportional to the resource .

References

Bifurcation theory